The Benjamin Sheares Bridge is the longest bridge in Singapore, spanning 1.8 km, and the tallest, at . 
It is named after Benjamin Sheares, the second President of Singapore, who died four months before the bridge was opened to the public on 26 September 1981. The bridge is part of the East Coast Parkway (ECP), at the western end of the expressway. The cost of construction was S$110 million.

The bridge has one other exit (signed exit 15 on the ECP) for Rochor Road and Suntec City.

The Benjamin Sheares Bridge crosses over the Marina Reservoir, along the southern coast of mainland Singapore. It passes through the planning areas of Kallang, Marina East, Marina South and Downtown Core.

Built over reclaimed land by construction company Sato Kogyo, the bridge is made of pre-stressed concrete and links Tanjong Rhu on the east coast to Marina Bay on the west coast.

Benjamin Sheares Bridge is the setting for the annual SAFRA Singapore Bay Run & Army Half Marathon (formerly the Sheares Bridge Run).

It is also pictured on the rear panel of the Ship Series S$50 banknote.

See also
 List of bridges in Singapore

References 
 

Bridges in Singapore
Bridges completed in 1981
Kallang
Downtown Core (Singapore)
Marina East
Marina South
1981 establishments in Singapore
20th-century architecture in Singapore